Tench Francis (1730–1800) was an American  merchant, lawyer and agent for the family of William Penn and the first cashier of the Bank of North America.

He was born the son of Elizabeth Turbitt and Tench Francis Sr., a prominent Philadelphia lawyer and jurist, at Fausley, Talbot County, Maryland, in 1730. For many years he acted as agent for the William Penn family in connection with their proprietary interests in provincial Pennsylvania. He became the first cashier of the Bank of North America, which office he held until his death. He is said to have contributed £5,000 for the support of the Revolutionary army. He later headed the commission that laid out the city of Pittsburgh, Pennsylvania. His appointment as Purveyor of Public Supplies on February 23, 1795, unified Navy pursers under a single person, and it is from this event that the Navy Supply Corps dates its creation.

He married Ann Willing Francis, daughter of Philadelphia mayor Charles Willing and Ann Shippen.

Francis died in Philadelphia, 1 May 1800; he is buried in Christ Church Burial Ground.

External links

Historical marker at his birthplace
Birthday of the Navy Supply Corps
Residence of Mr. Tench Francis in 1770 by D.J. Kennedy, Historical Society of Pennsylvania

1730 births
1800 deaths
Lawyers from Philadelphia
People of colonial Pennsylvania
People of Pennsylvania in the American Revolution
Colonial American merchants
Colonial American smugglers
People from Talbot County, Maryland
Burials at Christ Church, Philadelphia
United States Purveyor of Public Supplies